Shaaban Abash - (1890 – 1943) was the rider of the Abkhazian hundreds of the Circassian cavalry regiment of the Caucasian native division during the First World War. Shaaban was afro-abkazian.

Early life 
Shaaban Abash was born in the village of Adzyubzha, in what was then the Sukhum Okrug of the Kutais Governorate in the Russian Empire (now Abkhazia) to a peasant family of afro-abkazian Amber Abash and Sophia Mazalia. He had eleven brothers and sisters.

Military service and work 
At the age of 17, he enrolled in the Abkhazian hundred of the Circassian cavalry regiment, which took part in the First World War. He was awarded the Cross of St. George for making a reconnaissance raid across river Dniester and returning under fire after collecting valuable intelligence.
After the establishment of Soviet power, Shaaban Abash was an associate of the leader of Abkhazia Nestor Lakoba, in 1931 he was elected a member of the Central Election Commission of Abkhazia.

Notes

References

1890 births
1943 deaths